A referendum on presidential terms was held in Liberia on 7 October 1975, alongside simultaneous general elections. The change would limit a president to serving for a single term of eight years. Incumbent President William Tolbert promised he would leave office in 1983 even if the change was rejected. It passed with 90% of voters in favour.

Results

References

1975 referendums
1975 in Liberia
Referendums in Liberia
Constitutional referendums in Liberia
October 1975 events in Africa